High Rise Village is a high-elevation archeological site in Fremont County, Wyoming. Discovered in 2006 in the Wind River Range in Shoshone National Forest, the location features almost sixty lodge pads and has yielded more than 30,000 artifacts from the Archaic to the Protohistoric Period, a period of over 2500 years. The site is at  elevation and represents a major discovery of prehistoric occupation of high elevation zones, which had previously been neglected in archeological studies in the Western United States. High Rise Village and other similar locations share an association with stands of whitebark pines, an abundant food source.

High Rise Village was placed on the National Register of Historic Places on July 23, 2013.

References

External links
 High Rise Village at the Wyoming State Historic Preservation Office
 High Rise Village at the Jackson Hole Historical Society and Museum

National Register of Historic Places in Fremont County, Wyoming
Archaeological sites on the National Register of Historic Places in Wyoming
Shoshone National Forest